Acanthocercus kiwuensis, the Kivu blue-headed tree agama, is a species of lizard in the family Agamidae. It is a small lizard found in the Democratic Republic of the Congo.

References

Acanthocercus
Reptiles of the Democratic Republic of the Congo
Reptiles described in 1957
Taxa named by Wolfgang Klausewitz
Endemic fauna of the Democratic Republic of the Congo